The Christian Democratic Party of Honduras (Spanish: Partido Demócrata Cristiano de Honduras), known by the abbreviation DC, is a political party in Honduras. At the legislative elections, held on 25 November 2001, DC won 3.7% of the popular vote and 3 out of 128 seats in the National Congress. Its candidate at the presidential elections, Marco Orlando Iriarte, won 1.0% of the vote.

In the legislative elections of 27 November 2005, the party won 4 out of 128 seats in the Congress. Its candidate at the presidential elections, Juan Ramón Martínez won 1.4%.

DC's candidate in the 2009 presidential election was Felicito Ávila. The party supported the interim government of Roberto Micheletti which came to power in the 2009 Honduran coup d'état, itself a part of the 2009 Honduran constitutional crisis. Orle Solís was the party's candidate for the 2013 presidential elections.

References

External links
Official web site

Political parties in Honduras
Catholic political parties
Political parties established in 1968
Christian democratic parties in North America
1968 establishments in Honduras
Organizations based in Tegucigalpa